The  is a water bus service in Tokyo. A public company called  operates the lines on Tokyo riverside. The services include public lines listed below, as well as event cruises and chartered ships. All lines close on Monday (or the next day if Monday is a holiday), and between December 29 and January 3.

Lines
Arrows (→) indicate ships only go that direction. Dashes (—) indicate ships go both directions. English line names are tentative translations.

■ 
Sakurabashi — Ryōgoku — Etchūjima — Akashichō-Seirokagarden — Hama-rikyū — Odaiba-kaihinkōen
(Everyday)

■ 
Odaiba-kaihinkōen → (Seaside) → Kasairinkaikouen
Kasairinkaikouen → (Ariake West Canal) → Odaiba-kaihinkōen
(Every weekends/holidays, some weekdays)

■ 
Ryōgoku — Etchūjima — Akashichō-Seirokagarden — Hama-rikyū — Odaiba-kaihinkōen — (Ariake West Canal) — Tokyo-Big-Site — Kasairinkaikouen
(Every weekends/holidays, some weekdays)

■ 
Ryōgoku — Odaiba-kaihinkōen
(Some weekends/holidays)

■ 
Azusawa — Kamiya — Arakawayūen — Senju — Sakurabashi — Ryōgoku
(Some weekends/holidays)

■ 
Ryōgoku → Etchūjima → Akashichō-Seirokagarden → Hama-rikyū → Odaiba-kaihinkōen → (Ariake West Canal) → Tokyo-Big-Site → Kasairinkaikouen → (Arakawa Lock Gate) → Hirai → Senju → Sakurabashi → Ryōgoku
(Some Saturdays)

■ 
Ryōgoku → Hamachō → Etchūjima → Akashichō-Seirokagarden → Hama-rikyū → Odaiba-kaihinkōen → Fune-no-Kagakukan → Kasairinkaikouen → Hirai → (Iwabuchi Sluice) → Azusawa → Kamiya → Arakawayūen → Senju → Sakurabashi → Ryōgoku
(Some Sundays/holidays)

■ 
Ryōgoku → (Rainbow Bridge) → Ryōgoku
(Some weekends/holidays)

Landing fields

See also
Tokyo Cruise Ship
The Port Service
Keihin Ferry Boat
Water taxi

External links
 Tokyo Metropolitan Park Associartion official website
 Tokyo Metropolitan Park Associartion official website

Ferry companies of Japan
Water transport in Tokyo
Water taxis